Bonamia linearis is a herb in the family Convolvulaceae.

The perennial herb has a prostrate trailing habit. It blooms between October and July and produces white-cream flowers.

It is found on sand plains in the Kimberley and Pilbara regions of Western Australia where it grows in sandy soils.

References

linearis
Plants described in 1893